This is a list of known pirates, buccaneers, corsairs, privateers, river pirates, and others involved in piracy and piracy-related activities. This list includes both captains and prominent crew members. For a list of female pirates, see women in piracy. For pirates of fiction or myth, see list of fictional pirates.

Ancient World: 315 BC–197 AD

Middle Ages: 400–1585

Rise of the English Sea Dogs and Dutch Corsairs: 1560–1650

Age of the Buccaneers: 1650–1690

Golden Age of Piracy: 1690–1730

Post Golden Age: pirates, privateers, smugglers, and river pirates: 1730–1885

Renegades of the West Indies: 1820–1830

Piracy in East and Southeast Asia: 1400–1860

Blackbirders, Shanghaiers, Crimps and African Slave Traders: 1860–1900

Piracy from the 20th–21st century: 1901–

References

Further reading

Ancient World
 Abulafia, D., The Boundless Sea: A Human History of the Oceans (2019)
 Bulwer, Edward Lytton. Athens, Its Rise and Fall: With Views of the Literature, Philosophy, and Social Life of the Athenian People. New York: Harper & brothers Publishers, 1852.
 Emanuel, J.P., Black Ships and Sea Raiders: The Late Bronze and Early Iron Age Context of Odysseus' Second Cretan Lie (2017)
 Fleming, R., Britain after Rome. The Fall and Rise 400 to 1070 (2010)
 Fouracre, P (ed)., The New Cambridge Medieval History. Volume I c. 500–c. 700; Hamerow, H., The earliest Anglo-Saxon kingdoms; Lebecq, S., The northern Seas (fifth to eighth centuries) (2005)
 Haywood, J., Dark Age Naval Power. A Reassessment of Frankish and Anglo-Saxon Seafaring Activity (1999)
 Livy, History of Rome, Rev. Canon Roberts (translator), Ernest Rhys (Ed.); (1905) London: J. M. Dent & Sons, Ltd.
 Pearson, A.F., Barbarian Piracy and the Saxon Shore; A reappraisal (2005)
 Plutarch, "Aratus" in Plutarch's Lives, Arthur Hugh Clough (editor), John Dryden (translator). Two volumes. Modern Library; Modern Library Paperback Ed edition (2001). Downloadable version at Project Gutenberg. Vol. 2: .
 Polybius, Histories, Evelyn S. Shuckburgh (translator); London, New York. Macmillan (1889); Reprint Bloomington (1962).
 Pritchett, William Kendrick. The Greek State at War. Los Angeles: University of California Press, 1974. 
 Rawlinson, George; Benjamin Jowett, Henry Graham Dakyns and Edward James Chinnock. Greek Historians: The Complete and Unabridged Historical Works of Herodotus, Thucydides, Xenophon and Arrian. New York: Random House Incorporated, 1942.
 Rogozinski, Jan. Pirates!: Brigands, Buccaneers, and Privateers in Fact, Fiction, and Legend. New York: Da Capo Press, 1996. 
 Shaw, Philip. The Sublime. New York: Routledge, 2006. 
 Strabo, Geography, translated by Horace Leonard Jones; Cambridge, Massachusetts: Harvard University Press; London: William Heinemann, Ltd. (1924). Books 8–9: , Books 13–14: .
 Thirlwall, Connop. A History of Greece. London: Longman, Brown, Green & Longmans, 1846.
 Walbank, F. W., Philip V of Macedon, The University Press (1940).
 Waltari, Mika; The Etruscan (Turms kuolematon, 1955).
 Wilkes, John, The Illyrians (Peoples of Europe), Blackwell Publishers, (1995) .

Middle Ages
 Bono, Salvatore, Corsari nel Mediterraneo (Corsairs in the Mediterranean), Oscar Storia Mondadori. Perugia, 1993.
 Bottling, Douglas. The Pirates. Alexandria, Virginia: Time-Life Books Inc., 1978.
 Bracker, Jörgen : Klaus Störtebeker – only one of them. The history of the Vitalienbrüder. In: Wilfried honour-break (Hrsg.): Störtebeker. 600 years after its death (Hansi studies; Bd. 15). Porta Alba publishing house, Luebeck 2001, 
 Bradford, Ernle, The Sultan's Admiral: the Life of Barbarossa, London, 1968.
 Currey, E. Hamilton, Sea-Wolves of the Mediterranean,, London, 1910
 John of Fordun, Chronicle of the Scottish Nation. Edited by William Forbes Skene, translated by Felix J.H. Skene. Reprinted, Llanerch Press, Lampeter, 1993. 
 Knecht, R.J. Renaissance Warrior and Patron: The Reign of Francis I. New York: Cambridge University Press, 1996. 
 McDonald, R. Andrew Outlaws of Medieval Scotland: Challenges to the Canmore Kings, 1058–1266. Tuckwell Press, East Linton, 2003. 
 Meier, D., Seefahrer, Händler und Piraten im Mittelalter (2004)
 Oram, Richard, David I: The King who made Scotland. Tempus, Stroud, 2004. 
 Rogozinski, Jan. Pirates!: Brigands, Buccaneers, and Privateers in Fact, Fiction, and Legend. New York: Da Capo Press, 1996. 
 Tschan, F.J., Adam of Bremen. History of the Archbishops of Hamburg-Bremen (2002)
 William of Newburgh, Historia rerum anglicarum, Book 1 Ch. 24, "Of bishop Wimund, his life unbecoming a bishop, and how he was deprived of his sight", Full-text online.
 Wolf, John B., The Barbary Coast: Algeria under the Turks, New York, 1979; 

Rise of the English Sea Dogs and Dutch Privateers: 1560–1650
 Andrade, Tonio.  The Company's Chinese Pirates: How the Dutch East India Company Tried to Lead a Coalition of Pirates to War Against China, 1621–1662].
 Bicheno, Hugh Crescent and Cross: The Battle of Lepanto 1571, Phoenix Paperback, 2004, 
 
 
 Currey, E. Hamilton Sea-Wolves of the Mediterranean, London, 1910.
 
 Gerhard, Peter. Pirates of New Spain, 1575–1742. Mineola, NY: Courier Dover Publications, 2003. 
 van der Hoven, Marco, ed. Exercise of Arms: Warfare in the Netherlands, 1568–1648. Brill Academic Publishers, 1997. 
 Hughes-Hallett, Lucy.  Heroes: A History of Hero Worship.  Alfred A. Knopf, New York, 2004.  .
 Kupperman, Karen Ordahl. Providence Island, 1630–1641: The Other Puritan Colony. Cambridge: Cambridge University Press, 1993. 
 Lane, Kris E. Pillaging the Empire: Piracy in the Americas, 1500–1750. Armonk, New York: M.E. Sharpe, 1998. 
 Lunsford, V.W., Piracy and Privateering in the Golden Age Netherlands (2005)
 Manthorpe, Jonathan. Forbidden Nation: A History of Taiwan. New York, 2005.
 Mattingly, Garett, The Defeat of the Spanish Armada,  – a detailed account of the defeat of the Spanish Armada, it received a special citation from the Pulitzer Prize committee in 1960.
 Maxwell, Kenneth. Naked Tropics: Essays on Empire and Other Rogues. London: Routledge, 2003. 
 Mcgrath, John Terrence. The French in Early Florida: In the Eye of the Hurricane. Gainesville: University Press of Florida, 2000. 
 Michael, Franz. The Origin of Manchu Rule in China. Baltimore, 1942. Journal of World History, 2004 Dec.; 15(4):415–44.
 Miguel de Cervantes, in chapter XXXIX of his classic El Ingenioso Hidalgo Don Quijote de la Mancha, mentions Uluç Ali under the name of "Uchali", describing briefly his rise to the regency of Algiers.
 Rodger, N.A.M. The Safeguard of the Sea; A Naval History of Britain 660–1649. (London, 1997).
 Roding, Juliette and Lex Heerma van Voss, ed. The North Sea and Culture (1550–1800). Larenseweg, Netherlands: Uitgeverij VerLoren, 1996. 
 Rogozinski, Jan. Pirates!: Brigands, Buccaneers, and Privateers in Fact, Fiction, and Legend. New York: Da Capo Press, 1996. 
 Schmidt, Benjamin. Innocence Abroad: The Dutch Imagination and the New World, 1570–1670. New York: Cambridge University Press, 2001. 
 Stradling, R.A. The Armada of Flanders: Spanish Maritime Policy and European War, 1568–1668 (Cambridge Studies in Early Modern History). Cambridge University Press, 1992.  (issued in paperback 2004)
 Wolf, John B. The Barbary Coast: Algeria under the Turks, W.W. Norton, New York/London, 1979,  .

Age of the Buccaneers: 1650–1690
 The Pirates of the Caribbean II in Tortuga in the XVII Century Tortuga, 1918.
 Haring, Clarence. The Buccaneers in the West Indies in the XVII Century. Methuen, 1910.
 Walpole, Horace, Letters, Volume 4 (at Project Gutenberg)
 Lunsford, V.W., Piracy and Privateering in the Golden Age Netherlands (2005)
 Marley, David F. Pirates and Privateers of the Americas. Santa Barbara, CA: ABC-CLIO, Inc., 1994.
 Morris, Mowbray. Tales of the Spanish Main. Kessinger Publishing, 2005. 
 Riccardo Capoferro, Frontiere del racconto. Letteratura di viaggio e romanzo in Inghilterra, 1690–1750, Meltemi, 2007.
 Rogozinski, Jan. Pirates!: Brigands, Buccaneers, and Privateers in Fact, Fiction, and Legend. New York: Da Capo Press, 1996. 
 Rogozinski, Jan. Pirates: an A–Z Encyclopedia. New York: Da Capo Press, 1996.
 The Voyages and Adventures of Capt. Barth. Sharp and Others in the South Sea, Being a Journal of the Same; Also Capt. Van Horn with His Buccanieres Surprising of La Veracruz; to Which Is Added the True Relation of Sir Henry Morgan His Expedition Against the Spaniards in the West-Indies and His Taking Panama; Together with the President of Panama's [i.e., Juan Perez de Guzman] Account of the Same Expedition, Translated Out of the Spanish; and Col. Beeston's Adjustment of the Peace Between the Spaniards and English in the West Indies. London: Printed by B.W. for R.H. and S.T. and are to be sold by Walter Davis..., 1684.
 The Oxford Dictionary of National BiographyGolden Age of Piracy: 1690–1730
 Andrews, Thomas F. (editor) (1979) English Privateers at Cabo San Lucas: the Descriptive Accounts of Puerto Seguro by Edward Cooke (1712) and Woodes Rogers (1712), with Added Comments by George Shelvocke (1726) and William Betagh (1728). Dawson's Book Shop, Los Angeles.
 Bolster, W. Jeffrey. Black Jacks: African American Seamen in the Age of Sail.
 Breverton, Terry (2003) The Book of Welsh Pirates and Buccaneers. Glyndwr Publishing. 
 Cooke, Edward (1712) A Voyage to the South Sea and Round the World. 3 vols. Lintot, London
 Ellms, Charles (1837) The Pirate's Own Book: Authentic Narratives of the Most Celebrated Sea Robbers. Portland ME: Sanborn & Carter (reissued: New York: Dover Publications 1993 )
 Gilbert, H. (1986) The Book of Pirates. London: Bracken Books.
 Johnson, Charles (1724) A General History of the Pyrates. 2 vols. London: Charles Rivington
 Johnson, Charles (1724) A General History of the Pyrates, from their First Rise and Settlement in the Island of Providence, to the Present Time... 2nd ed.  London: Printed for, and sold by, T. Warner
 Johnson, Charles (1724) A General History of the Robberies and Murders of the Most Notorious Pirates (1998 ed.).  Conway Maritime Press.  .
 Johnson, Charles (1728) The History of the Pirates: containing the lives of Captain Mission....  London: Printed for, and sold by, T. Woodward, 1728.
 Little, Bryan (1960) Crusoe's Captain: Being the Life of Woodes Rogers, seaman, trader, colonial governor. London: Odhams Press
 Lunsford, V.W., Piracy and Privateering in the Golden Age Netherlands (2005)
 Menefee, S. P. "Vane, Charles," in Oxford Dictionary of National Biography, vol. 56 (2004): pp. 94–95.
 Pennell, C. R. (2001) Bandits at Sea: a Pirates Reader. New York: NYU Press 
 Pickering, David (2006) Pirates. CollinsGem. New York: HarperCollins Publishers; pp. 80–82
 Rediker, Marcus (2004) Villains of All Nations: Atlantic Pirates in the Golden Age. Boston: Beacon Press 
 Rogers, Woodes (1712) A Cruising Voyage Round the World. London: Andrew Bell
 Rogozinski, Jan (1996) Pirates!: Brigands, Buccaneers, and Privateers in Fact, Fiction, and Legend. New York: Da Capo Press 
 Rogozinski, Jan (2000) Honor Among Thieves: Captain Kidd, Henry Every, and the Pirate Democracy in the Indian Ocean. Stackpole Books 
 Seitz, Don Carlos, Gospel, Howard F. & Wood, Stephen (2002) Under the Black Flag: Exploits of the Most Notorious Pirates. Mineola, New York: Courier Dover Publications 
 Smith, Captain Alexander (1926) History of the Highwaymen. London: George Routledge & Sons 
 Steele, Philip (2004) The World of Pirates. Boston: Kingfisher Publications 
 The Tryals of Major Stede Bonnet, and Other Pirates. London: Printed for Benj. Cowse at the Rose and Crown in St Paul's Church-Yard, 1719.

Decline of Piracy: 1730–1900
 Cordingly, David (1997). Under the Black Flag: The Romance and the Reality of Life Among the Pirates. Harvest Books.
 Gregory, Kristiana. The Stowaway: A Tale of California Pirates. Scholastic Trade, 1995. 
 Pickering, David. "Pirates". CollinsGem. HarperCollins Publishers, New York. pp. 96–97. 2006
 Rothert, Otto A. The Outlaws of Cave-In-Rock, Otto A. Rothert, Cleveland 1924; rpt. 1996 

External links
Ancient World
 It all began with piracy.
 An article about the Roman Navy, with information on Anicetus.
 Herodotus – The History of Herodotus, with information on Dionysius the Phocaean.
 The Pirates Hold – Entry for Glauketas.
 
Middle Ages
 Arctic Sailors Escaped from Cyclops
 Jean Ango at Encyclopædia Britannica.com
 Genealogy – Pier Gerlofs Donia at Langenberg-Laagland.com, see Pier Gerlofs biography,  PDF
 An article from the English Historical Review, vol. 27 (1912) gives biographical details of Eustace the Monk.
 Chronological list of important dates and events in the life of Turgut Reis (Italian)
 Agreement on reparations for injuries and damages by vitalians (made between King Henry IV of England and the Hanseatic League)
 Magister Wigbold and the Likedeelers (in German)
 "Heard at Byland: Wimund's Woes" from Byland Abbey website, Retrieved Jan. 2005.

Rise of the English Sea Dogs and Dutch Privateers (1560–1650)
 Two variants on the ballad of Andrew Bartin / Barton.
  A short biography of Hendrik Brouwer.
 John D. Neville. "History of Thomas Cavendish", Heritage Education Program, US National Park Service.
 Christian Isobel Johnstone (1831). Lives and Voyages of Drake, Cavendish, and Dampier. Oliver & Boyd. From Google Books.
 Christian Isobel Johnstone (1892). Early English voyagers : or, The adventures and discoveries of Drake, Cavendish, and Dampier. London: Nelson. From Internet Archive
 Francois Le Clerc, at Rob Ossian's Pirate Cove
 Isle of Tortuga: Jacob Collaart
 Oliver Seeler's website "Sir Francis Drake"
 
 An exhibit in the National Archives on John Hawkins.
 A timeline of Piet Hein's life.
 Privateers and Pirates: James Riskinner
 Piracy in the Caribbean
Age of the Buccaneers (1650–1690)
 Jean Bart (English) 
 Un dictionnaire biographique de la flibuste (1648–1688), Biographies – B 
 Famous Historical Pirates – Edward Collier
 John Coxon at The Pirate King
 
 
 
 Notable Voyagers, W.H.G. Kingston and Henry Frith – Chapter XXI: Voyages and adventures of William Dampier – from AD 1674
 Piracy in the Caribbean
Golden Age of Piracy (1690–1730)
 Brethren of the Coast: Captain Thomas Anstis
 Biography of Bartholomew Roberts
 The Pirate Cove! – George Booth
 National Geographic, "Capt. Samuel Bellamy, Rogue Romeo"
 A Biography of Stede Bonnet
 Anne Bonny at TheWayofthePirates.com
 Christopher Condent at Rob Ossian's Pirate Cove!
 Pirate Encyclopedia: Howell Davis
 Pirates hold: William Fly
 The Pirate Cove! – John Halsey
 Biography of Miguel Henríquez
 Benjamin Hornigold at TheWayofthePirates.com
 Benjamin Hornigold at AgeofPirates.com
 Piracy in the Caribbean
Decline of Piracy (1730–1900)
 The California State Military Museum - Spanish and Mexican California: Hippolyte de Bouchard and His Attacks on the California Missions
 Hipólito (Hypolite) Bouchard and the Raid of 1818 article at the Monterey County Historical Society official website – URL accessed on December 2, 2005.
 American Museum of Natural History – Spanish Colonial History
 Gasparilla Pirate Festival
 José Gaspar site 
 Bradlee's account of Gasparilla and the Story of Juan Gomez
 Charles Gibbs Treasure
 Charles Gibbs at Rob Ossian's Pirate Cove!
 Don Pedro Gilbert at Age of Pirates.com
 "The Execution of Gordon, The Slave-Trader", Harper's Weekly, March 8, 1862.
 "Slave Captain to be Hanged", Worcester Aegis and Transcript, December 7, 1861, p. 1. (From Letters of the Civil War'' (website), archived at Wayback Machine, November 15, 2004.)
 Australian Broadcasting Commission, 22 September 2003, transcript of television program on Jørgen Jørgensen
 A biography of Jørgensen
 Bell Anthology – Samuel Mason
 Cheung Po Tsai Cave at discoverhongkong.com 
 Piracy in the Caribbean
Piracy in the 20th and 21st centuries
 The Politics of Extinction 
 Detailed profile of Paul Watson by Raffi Khatchadourian, from The New Yorker, November 5, 2007

!
Pirates
Pirates
Pirates
17th-century pirates
18th-century pirates
19th-century pirates